Stéphane Sageder (born 1 January 1971) is a French weightlifter. He competed in the men's light heavyweight event at the 1992 Summer Olympics.

References

1971 births
Living people
French male weightlifters
Olympic weightlifters of France
Weightlifters at the 1992 Summer Olympics
Sportspeople from Alpes-de-Haute-Provence